Chesgin (also Romanized as Chesgīn, Cheskīn, Chasgīn, and Chīskīn; also known as Chegīn and Chekīn) is a village in Ebrahimabad Rural District, Ramand District, Buin Zahra County, Qazvin Province, Iran. At the 2006 census, its population was 480, in 146 families.

References 

Populated places in Buin Zahra County